Shin Dong-hyuk, a Korean name consisting of the family name Shin and the masculine given name Dong-hyuk, may refer to:

 Shin Dong-hyuk, a North Korean defector and human rights activist living in South Korea
 Shin Dong-hyuk (footballer) (born 1987), South Korean footballer
 Shin Dong-hyuk (Hotelier), a fictional character in the TV series Hotelier